Kurds of European Ancestry are individuals of Kurdish ethnicity who have ancestors from Europe, and have went through a process of Kurdification. Kurds are an ethnically diverse group, with a complex history shaped by migrations and interactions with neighboring populations. Genetic studies have shown that some Kurdish populations have genetic markers associated with European ancestry, which reflect the diverse genetic makeup of the Kurds.

Assimilation of people of European Descent into Kurdish culture, or Kurdification, is a historical process that has occurred over centuries. This process has been shaped by various factors, including political, economic, and cultural factors, as well as by the complex history of Kurdish migrations and interactions with neighboring populations.

During the Ottoman Empire, Kurdish rulers and tribal leaders would often assimilate non-Kurdish populations into Kurdish culture and society. This process was facilitated by the decentralized nature of Kurdish governance, which allowed for the incorporation of diverse ethnic and religious groups into Kurdish society.

In the 20th century, the process of Kurdish assimilation became more complex due to the impact of European colonialism and the formation of nation-states in the Middle East. This led to the displacement of Kurdish populations and the fragmentation of Kurdish identity and culture.

The migration of European ethnic groups into Kurdish regions is another historical event that has shaped the complex history of Kurdish identity and culture. During the early 20th century, the Ottoman Empire encouraged the settlement of Christian populations from the Caucasus and the Balkans into Kurdish regions in order to weaken the Kurdish resistance. An example of this is the settlement of Assyrians in the Hakkâri region of southeastern Turkey, and the Chechens, Bosniaks, Albanians and Kosovars in the Mosul Vilayet (modern-day Iraqi Kurdistan), which had a significant impact on the region's demographics and culture.

In the aftermath of World War I and the collapse of the Ottoman Empire, European colonial powers such as France and Britain imposed new borders and boundaries on the Middle East, which led to the displacement of Kurdish populations and the fragmentation of Kurdish identity and culture. This process was further complicated by the policies of nation-states such as Turkey, which sought to assimilate Kurdish populations into a homogeneous Turkish identity

History

Migration to Kurdistan 
During the late 19th and early 20th centuries, the Ottoman Empire encouraged the settlement of various European ethnic groups, including Chechens, Bosniaks, Albanians, and Kosovars, in Kurdish regions to weaken the Kurdish resistance. For instance, in the Mosul Vilayet, which is now part of Iraqi Kurdistan, the Ottoman authorities encouraged the settlement of several thousand Slavic Muslim families from Bosnia, Herzegovina, and Montenegro. This migration had a significant impact on the region's demographics and culture.

In addition to this, during the same period, the Ottoman Empire also resettled Assyrians, an Eastern Christian minority, in the Hakkari region of southeastern Turkey, which is a predominantly Kurdish area. The Assyrians had been displaced from their original homeland in northern Iraq due to the genocide committed by the Ottoman Empire during World War I. The settlement of Assyrians in Hakkari had a significant impact on the region's demographic and cultural landscape.

The migration of these European ethnic groups into Kurdish regions was facilitated by the Ottoman authorities, who sought to weaken the Kurdish resistance by creating a more diverse and less cohesive population in the region. This migration had a significant impact on the region's demographics and culture, as well as on the Kurdish identity and culture

Today, the descendants of these European settlers still reside in the Kurdish regions of Iraq and Turkey, and many have assimilated into Kurdish culture over the generations. This assimilation has contributed to the diverse and complex history of Kurdish identity and culture, which has been shaped by migrations and interactions with neighboring populations.

Demographics

See also 

 Persecution of Muslims
 Chechen Kurds
 Kurdish culture
 Kurdification

References 

Kurdish people
Kurdistan